Nieminen is a surname originating in Finland (in Finnish, it means "small peninsula"), where it is the third most common surname.

Anu Nieminen (born 1977), badminton player
Eeti Nieminen (1927–2016), Nordic skier
Jarkko Nieminen (born 1981), tennis player
Kauko Nieminen (1929–2010), natural scientist and eccentric
Kauko Nieminen (born 1979), speedway rider
Lasse Nieminen (born 1966), ice hockey player
Mika Nieminen (born 1966), ice hockey player
Niko Nieminen (born 1982), ice hockey player
Pertti Nieminen (born 1936), ice hockey player
Pertti Neumann (born 1959, formerly Pertti Nieminen), musician
Rami Nieminen (born 1966), football player
Timo Nieminen (born 1981), tennis player
Toni Nieminen (born 1975), ski jumper
Veli Nieminen (1886–1936), gymnast and sports shooter
Ville Nieminen (born 1977), ice hockey player

References

Finnish-language surnames